Samuel Rowe may refer to:

 Samuel Rowe (antiquary) (1793–1853), English vicar and antiquary
 Samuel Rowe (colonial administrator) (1835–1888), English governor of Sierra Leone 
 Samuel Evans Rowe (1834–1897), Methodist minister and missionary in South Africa
 Samuel Harold Rowe (cricketer)  (1883–1968), West Australian cricketer, footballer and administrator